Kevin O'Toole may refer to:

Kevin F. O'Toole, American attorney and gaming regulator
Kevin J. O'Toole (born 1964), American politician
Kevin O'Toole (bodybuilder) (born 1965), Canadian bodybuilder and mixed martial artist
Kevin O'Toole (soccer), American soccer player
"Kevin J. O'Toole", a song by Street Dogs on the album State of Grace